Aosta Cathedral is a Roman Catholic cathedral in Aosta, in north-west Italy, built in the 4th century. It is the episcopal seat of the Diocese of Aosta.

In the 11th century the Palaeo-Christian structure was replaced by a new one, dedicated to the Assumption of the Virgin Mary and Saint John the Baptist. The architecture of the cathedral was modified during the 15th and 16th century.

The present façade, in Neoclassical style, was built between 1846 and 1848. The structures remaining from the Romanesque period are two clock-towers and the crypt, and also the remaining part of an Ottonian fresco cycle on the church ceiling.

External links
 Aosta Valley official website: Aosta Cathedral 
 Webdiocesi.chiesacattolica website: article on Aosta Cathedral 
 Website of the Banca Ipermediale delle Vetrate Italiane (CNR): article by E. L. Cappa on Aosta Cathedral 
 Aosta Valley official website: article by L. Appolonia & D. Viquéry on restoration of cathedral façade 
 organivalledaosta.altervista.org Private website on cathedral organ

Bibliography
 
 Robert Berton, La cathedrale d'Aoste, Aoste : Imprimerie Marguerettaz 
 Sandra Barberi, Cathédrale d'Aoste : les fresques du XIe siècle, Aoste : Imprimerie valdôtaine, 2006
 Cortelazzo, Mauro – Perinetti, Renato – Papone, Paolo – Vallet, Viviana, La cathédrale d'Aoste : du chantier roman à nos jours, études archéologiques et textes: Mauro Cortelazzo, Paolo Papone, Renato Perinetti, Viviana Vallet, Aoste: Région autonome Vallée d'Aoste. Assessorat de l'éducation et de la culture. Département de la surintendance des activités et des biens culturels, 2008 Cadran solaire
Paolo Curtaz, Omar Borettaz, Ronnie Borbey, L'eglise cathédrale d'Aoste : un lieu, une histoire, la foi d'un peuple, Aosta
Lin Colliard, La Cathédrale d'Aoste au XVe siècle : extrait de l'ordinaire d'Aoste, Aoste : Imprimerie valdôtaine, 1978
Édouard Aubert, Les mosaïques de la Cathédrale d'Aoste, Paris : Librairie archéologique de Victor Didron, 1857
 Joseph-Auguste Duc, Symbolisme architectural de la Cathédrale d'Aoste, Aoste : Imprimerie catholique, 1901
 Joseph-Auguste Duc, Mosaique du chœur de la Cathédrale d'Aoste : son âge, in Société académique, religieuse et scientifique du Duché d'Aoste
La restauration de la façade de la cathédrale d'Aoste, Aoste : Région autonome Vallée d'Aoste. Assessorat de l'éducation et de la culture. Surintendance aux biens culturels, 1997
Abbé Joseph-Marie Henry, Maîtrise de la Cathédrale d'Aoste, Aoste : Imprimerie catholique, 1919
Orphée Zanolli, Mélodies inédites à l'usage de la Cathédrale d'Aoste : les Noëls en vieux français, Aoste : Musumeci, 1977
Charles Bonnet, Renato Perinetti, Remarques sur la crypte de la cathedrale d'Aoste, Aoste : Musumeci, 1977
 Robert Berton, Les stalles de la cathédrale d'Aoste avec leurs miséricordes : un joyau d'art gothique du XVe siècle, préface d'Adrien Bruhl, Novara : De Agostini, copyr. 1961
Duc, Joseph-Auguste, Le Chapitre de la cathédrale d'Aoste a-t-il été autrefois régulier?, in Société académique, religieuse et scientifique du Duché d'Aoste
Zanolli, Orphée Les "obitus" et les notes marginales du martyrologe de la Cathédrale d'Aoste (XIIIe siècle)
 Barberi, S., 2002:  Cattedrale di Aosta. Gli affreschi dell'XI secolo. Published on behalf of the Regione Autonoma Valle d'Aosta, printed by Umberto Allemandi Editore, Torino
 Brezzi, E. Rossetti, 1989: La pittura in Valle d'Aosta tra la fine del 1300 e il primo quarto del 1500. Firenze: Casa Editrice Le Lettere
 Garino, Luigi (ed.), n.d.: Museo del Tesoro, Cattedrale di Aosta, catalogue edited by the Aosta Cathedral chapter
 Orlandoni, B., 1995: Architettura in Valle d'Aosta – Il romanico e il gotico. Ivrea: Priuli & Verlucca
 Orlandoni, B., 1995: Architettura in Valle d'Aosta – Il Quattrocento. Ivrea: Priuli & Verlucca
 Aosta Valley autonomous region, 2007: La Cattedrale di Aosta; dalla domus ecclesiae al cantiere romanico or  La cathédrale d'Aoste : de la domus ecclesiae au chantier roman (text and DVD). Aosta: Cadran Solaire 
 ditto, 2008

Roman Catholic cathedrals in Italy
Cathedral
Romanesque architecture in Italy
Churches in Aosta Valley